The women's pole vault at the 2019 Asian Athletics Championships was held on 23 April.

Results

References

Pole
Pole vault at the Asian Athletics Championships
2019 in women's athletics